Velleman is a Belgian producer and distributor of electronics, in particular for hobbyists. In a blog post introducing the products, RadioShack claimed Velleman to be "the undisputed leader in do-it-yourself kits and components".

The company was founded in 1972 as a family-owned maker of do-it-yourself electronic kits, and incorporated as Velleman NV in the 1980s. It is headquartered in Gavere in East Flanders, 10 km south-west of Ghent, has 165 employees worldwide and a turnover of 37 million euros (2009).

See also
 List of 3D printer manufacturers

References

 Company profile

External links
 Velleman, company website

Electronics companies of Belgium
Electronic kit manufacturers
Companies based in East Flanders
Gavere
Electronics companies established in 1975
Belgian brands
1975 establishments in Belgium
3D printer companies